Phyllis T. Kernick (December 14, 1924 – January 21, 2009) is a former Democratic member of the Pennsylvania House of Representatives.

References

Democratic Party members of the Pennsylvania House of Representatives
Women state legislators in Pennsylvania
2009 deaths
1924 births
20th-century American politicians
20th-century American women politicians
21st-century American women